"Under the Tree" (stylized in uppercase) is a single created by the Japanese band SiM. The song was released by Pony Canyon on March 4, 2023, and was used as the ending theme for the first half of the anime Attack on Titan: The Final Season Part 3.

Background and announcement 
SiM made their musical debut for the anime Attack on Titan in 2022 with the song the "The Rumbling". The opening theme was met with overall positive audience feedback, amassing a total of 200 million listens on streaming platforms at the time of the release of "Under the Tree". The band's success in making the previous opening motivated the producers of the series to bring back SiM to perform the anime's final theme song.

The song was announced for the first time on SiM's Twitter account on February 25, 2023, along with the cover art for the song and its release date of March 4, 2023.

Release 
Alongside various music streaming platforms including Spotify, Apple Music, Deezer, and Linkfire; the song was released exclusively on NHK television during the one-hour special premiere of the anime's new series on March 4, 2023 at 12:00 AM JST, before being released internationally on Crunchyroll, Funimation, and Hulu.

Upon the song's release; the song drew largely positive feedback from the community. The song was also released alongside a "special animation video" published by Pony Canyon on their YouTube channel.

Contents 
According to a separate statement made by SiM's lyricist MAH also on February 25; the music includes elements of string orchestra, choir, and deep bass mixed together. In universe, the song is also themed to be "Mikasa's song," one of the two deuteragonists of the show, in contrast to SiM's previous single "The Rumbling", which focused primarily on the show's protagonist Eren Yeager. The song's cover art also depicts Mikasa who has taken off a red scarf that Eren gave her when they were children, symbolizing a rift taking place between the two characters in the show.

Track listing

Charts

Weekly charts

Notes

References

External links 
 Spotify link by SiM
 YouTube link by SiM
 Special animation YouTube video by Pony Canyon

2023 singles
2023 songs
Anime songs
Attack on Titan
Japanese-language songs
Pony Canyon singles